Prisca Bustamante (born 10 March 1964) is a Peruvian-Ecuadorian actress who has appeared in several Ecuadorian television shows, such as  on Ecuavisa and Departamento 69 on Canal Uno.

Early life
Prisca Bustamante was born in Lima on 10 March 1964. After graduating from school at age 16, she worked as a clothing seller at a department store in the Miraflores District of Lima. She also sold English courses, and worked as a babysitter during her exchange stay in Germany. She came to Ecuador to visit a friend, and decided to move there permanently.

Career

Theater
Her friend introduced her to Marina Salvarezza, an Italian theater and television actress based in Ecuador, who gave Bustamante her first role, in the play The House of Bernarda Alba.

In 1987, she was cast in the play Blithe Spirit by Noël Coward, along with Martha Ontaneda, Marina Salvarezza, Julio César Andrade, and María del Carmen Montesdeoca.

In 2013, she played María Callas, in Master Class by Terrence McNally, under the direction of Eduardo Muñoa.

In March 2017, Bustamante and Belén Idrovo presented the play  at the Pop Up Teatro - Café in central Urdesa. This ran without any problems. However, the same work met with controversy when put on at a theater in Samborondón. Protesters from Catholic groups arrived on 11 January 2018, along with policemen and authorities of the municipality, who shut down the show on the grounds that the premises did not have the correct operating permits. After establishing that the theater had the required permits, the play opened without incident.

Television
Bustamante made her television debut in the telenovela .

She had her first leading role in the Ecuavisa series , as Doña Bacha.

She starred in the comedy series Departamento 69 on Canal Uno, alongside Azucena Mora and Amparo Guillén.

In 2017, Bustamante and singer Nikki Mackliff were offered roles on the telenovela Lo Que está Pa Ti on GamaTV. However, the next day, after having had a reading of the script, she and Mackliff were summoned to the channel to be fired. Both expressed discontent over this on social networks, attributing it to their not being sympathizers of the political ideology of the Rafael Correa government, since the channel was seized by the state.

From 2018 to 2019, she was in the biographical telenovela .

In 2020, for the first time in her career, Bustamante played a villain in a telenovela,  on TC Televisión.

Radio
Bustamante hosted the radio program Qué pasa with Mariela Viteri on Fuego 106.5 FM.

Personal life
Bustamante has one son. She is an activist for animals, and puts out a calendar every year showing pets of the Patitas Foundation.

Filmography

TV series and telenovelas
  (1990–1991)
  (1991)
  (1991–1992) ... Doña Bacha
  (1991–1996) ... Renata Hermelinda Villegas de Vargas 
  (1992–1993)
  (1993–1994)
 Palabras al viento (1999–2000)
  (2005–2006)
 Departamento 69 (2006)
 El Gabinete (2008) ... La Pelu
  (2008) ... Rosita
 Corazón contento (2009) ... Angustias
  (2010) ... Sol
  (2013) ... Doña Débora de Narváez
  (2014–2019) ... Cástula Posligua de Galindo
 La Trinity (2017–2018)
  (2018–2019) ... Cecilia de Corona
 Antuca me enamora (2020) ... Dorotea Petersen de Andrade
  (2021) ... Consuelo

References

External links
 

1964 births
Actresses from Lima
Ecuadorian stage actresses
Ecuadorian telenovela actresses
Living people
21st-century Ecuadorian women